Jörgen "George" Eriksson (born 7 January 1973) is a Swedish former football defender. He played 265 games for Trelleborgs FF between 1991 and 2002. A youth international for Sweden between 1994 and 1995, he appeared nine times for the Sweden U21 team.

References

1973 births
Living people
Swedish footballers
Trelleborgs FF players
Association football defenders
Allsvenskan players